George Mathen, also known as Appupen, is a noted graphic novelist and artist from Bangalore, India.

References

External links
George Mathen at Tehelka
“We try to get through to people using art and humor” - in conversation with Appupen on GraphicShelf

Living people
Indian graphic novelists
Artists from Bangalore
Year of birth missing (living people)